The following are the events in professional sumo during 2000.

Tournaments
Hatsu basho, Ryogoku Kokugikan, Tokyo, 9 – 23 January
Haru basho, Osaka Prefectural Gymnasium, Osaka, 12 – 26 March
Natsu basho, Ryogoku Kokugikan, Tokyo, 7 – 21 May
Nagoya basho, Aichi Prefectural Gymnasium, Nagoya, 9 – 23 July
Aki basho, Ryogoku Kokugikan, Tokyo, 3 – 17 September
Kyushu basho, Fukuoka International Centre, Kyushu, 5 – 19 November

News

January
At the Hatsu basho in Tokyo, sekiwake Musoyama wins his first top makuuchi division yusho or tournament championship with a 13–2 record, finishing one win ahead of Musashigawa stablemate Miyabiyama, and yokozuna Takanohana. He wins Technique and Outstanding Performance Prizes (the latter shared with Miyabiyama). The Fighting Spirit Award is given jointly to Kyokutenho and Takanowaka.  Yokozuna Musashimaru  pulls out through injury. It is the first time he has missed any bouts in his career and it brings to an end a record run of 55 consecutive tournaments with a majority of wins. Former komusubi Oginishiki wins his second juryo division championship in a row.

February
 Former maegashira Kushimaumi branches out from Dewanoumi stable to open his own Tagonoura stable.
 Kise stable shuts down as its stablemaster, former maegashira Kiyonomori, is approaching the mandatory retirement age of 65.

March
The sumo world has to deal with several allegations of match-fixing - Hawaiian former wrestler Takamio tells the Shukan Post that he helped yokozuna Akebono fix matches, ex-komusubi Itai makes similar allegations in a series of articles, and Shikinohana says current members of the Sumo Association's hierarchy also engaged in the practice when they were active wrestlers decades ago.
The Osaka tournament has a surprise winner: 32-year-old maegashira Takatoriki, who was on the brink of demotion but pulls off a stunning 13–2 score. He also wins the Outstanding Performance Award, and a record tenth Fighting Spirit Prize. Musoyama finishes runner-up alongside Akebono and earns promotion to ozeki. He also receives his fourth Technique Prize. Miyabiyama gets a share of the Fighting Spirit Prize. Takanohana's elder brother and fellow yokozuna Wakanohana announces his retirement at the age of 29, after failing to recover from a leg injury sustained in the previous September tournament. He proved unable to add to his five career championships in his brief yokozuna career. Tochinohana wins the juryo yusho.

April
27: The Sumo Association award Wakanohana a bonus of 70 million yen for his services to sumo.
30: 4500 spectators attend a training session for all the top rikishi at the Kokugikan, which is open to the public for the first time.

May

For the third tournament in a row, a rikishi below the rank of ozeki takes the championship: this time it is komusubi Kaio with a 14–1 record. He receives his ninth Outstanding Performance Prize, and fifth Fighting Spirit Award.  Yokozuna Takanohana and Akebono finish one win behind on 13–2. Musoyama misses his debut ozeki tournament through injury. Miyabiyama joins him at the rank after posting his second consecutive 11–4 record, but the decision to promote him is (unusually) not unanimous. He also gets a share of the Shukun-sho.  He replaces veteran Takanonami, who is demoted from ozeki for the second time. Tochinohana, in his top division debut, scores 12 and receives the Fighting Spirit and Technique Prizes.  A record eight sekitori miss the tournament, the most since the six tournaments per year schedule was introduced in 1958. Wakanosato, recuperating from injury, wins the juryo championship. Former maegashira Ganyū retires.

July
In Nagoya, Akebono wins his first yusho since 1997, finishing one win ahead of sekiwake Tochiazuma with a 13–2 score. Tochiazuma receives the Technique Prize. Takanohana pulls out after injuring his elbow. Musoyama can only manage four wins and is demoted from ozeki. Kaio by contrast follows up his yusho in May with a fine 11–4 record and is finally promoted to ozeki at the age of 28. He also receives a record-equalling tenth Outstanding Performance Prize. The Fighting Spirit Award is shared between newcomers Takamisakari and Aminishiki, who each score ten. American Sentoryu also gets a winning score in his debut top division tournament. Wakanosato wins his second juryo yusho in a row. The makushita division championship is won by Asashoryu with a perfect 7–0 record.

August
Tatsutagawa stable shuts down as its stablemaster, former sekiwake Aonosato, is approaching the mandatory retirement age. Its wrestlers, including sekitori Jumonji, Shikishima and Toyozakura,  move to Michinoku stable.

September
Having suffered from injuries and been looking below par all year,  Musashimaru dominates the Aki basho, losing only on the final day to win his eighth championship with a 14–1 score. Akebono finishes runner-up on 13–2. Takanohana sits the tournament out. Musoyama regains his ozeki rank by winning ten bouts, meaning there will be five ozeki in November. Tochinohana and Hayateumi share the Technique Prize. Wakanosato gets the Fighting Spirit Award on his return to makuuchi. Kotomitsuki wins the juryo championship. Popular top division veterans Kotonishiki and Mitoizumi, now in juryo, both announce their retirements. Also retiring are former maegashira Kitakachidoki (meaning there are no longer any sekitori from Hokkaido) and Ohinode.
23: Wakanohana's retirement ceremony (danpatsu-shiki) takes place at the Kokugikan. Accompanying him in his final yokozuna dohyo-iri are his fellow grand champions Akebono and Takanohana.

November
In Kyushu, Akebono wins his second yusho of the year, and eleventh overall, with a fine 14–1 record. This means he has more wins this year than any other wrestler. He finishes one win ahead of newcomer Kotomitsuki, who wins all three special prizes. Wakanosato also receives his first Outstanding Performance Prize. Kinkaiyama wins his third juryo championship. Ex maegashira Dewaarashi retires.
18: The former Wakanohana announces he is giving up his elder position in the Sumo Association to become a TV tarento.

Deaths
14 Jan: Onaruto Oyakata, former maegashira Yoshinotani, aged 50.

See also
Glossary of sumo terms
List of past sumo wrestlers
List of years in sumo
List of yokozuna

References

Sumo by year
Sumo